Liavol-e Sofla (also Romanized as Līāvol-e Soflá; also known as Layāvol Pā”īn, Liavalpain, Līāvol-e Pā’īn, Līāvol Pā’īn, and Līāwalpāīn) is a village in Dolfak Rural District, Khorgam District, Rudbar County, Gilan Province, Iran. At the 2006 census, its population was 66, in 20 families.

References 

Populated places in Rudbar County